is an above-ground railway station on the Tokyo Metro Tozai Line in the city of Ichikawa, Chiba, Japan, operated by the Tokyo subway operator Tokyo Metro.. Its station number is T-20.

Lines

Station layout
This station consists of two elevated island platforms on the third floor ("3F") level serving a total of four tracks.

Platforms

History
The station opened by Teito Rapid Transit Authority on 19 March 1969.

The station facilities were inherited by Tokyo Metro after the privatization of the Teito Rapid Transit Authority (TRTA) in 2004.

Passenger statistics
In fiscal 2019, the station was used by an average of 57,818 passengers daily (boarding passengers only).

See also
 List of railway stations in Japan

References

External links

 Gyōtoku Station information (Tokyo Metro) 

Railway stations in Chiba Prefecture
Stations of Tokyo Metro
Tokyo Metro Tozai Line
Railway stations in Japan opened in 1969